Wang Chang may refer to:

 Wang Lang (Xin dynasty) (died 24), originally named Wang Chang, warlord at the end of the Xin dynasty
 Wang Chang (Three Kingdoms) (died 259), Cao Wei official
 Wang Jipeng (died 939), emperor of Min, known as Wang Chang after 935
 Wang Chang (died 1389), the personal name of King Chang of Goryeo
 Wang Chang (badminton) (born 2001), Chinese badminton player
Wang Chang (Yanqing) (王常), style name Yanqing, Xin dynasty and early Eastern Han general
Wang Chang (Shumao) (王暢), style name Shumao, late Eastern Han official
Wang Chang (Qing Dynasty) (王昶), Qing dynasty scholar

See also
Wang Zhang (died 950), Later Han official, romanised as "Wang Chang" in Wade-Giles
Wangchang (disambiguation) for places